Cho Kuk (Korean: 조국, born 6 April 1965) is a South Korean jurist and politician. He was the Senior Secretary to the President for Civil Affairs from 2017 to 2019 in the Moon Jae-in Cabinet. On 9 September 2019, President Moon Jae-in appointed Cho as Minister of Justice, replacing the incumbent Park Sang-ki. In 2019, Cho Kuk was involved in a series of controversies, including allegations of illicit business activities and falsification of academic achievements of his daughter. On 14 October, Cho Kuk announced his resignation as Minister of Justice over corruption allegations.

Early life and education 
Cho was born in West District of Busan in 1965, as the eldest son of the ex-Director of Institute of Ungdong, Cho Byun-hyun (died in 2013), and his wife and the current Director of the institute, Park Jung-sook. He attended Gudeok Elementary School in Busan, then moved to Seoul and studied at Daesin Middle School. After he returned to Busan, he finished his secondary education at Hyekwang High School.

Cho earned bachelor's and master's degrees in law studies from Seoul National University, and a doctoral degree (J.S.D) from the University of California, Berkeley in the United States. He was also a visiting scholar at the University of Oxford and University of Leeds in the United Kingdom.

Cho used to be a lecturer in law studies at the University of Ulsan from 1992 to 1994 and from 1999 to 2000, then at Dongguk University from 2000 to 2001, and later at Seoul National University—where he had earned his bachelor's degree—from 2001 to 2004. While at Seoul National University, he was promoted from lecturer to senior lecturer (2004–2009), then to full professor in 2009.

Political career 
Cho showed interest in politics at the end of the 1980s, while studying at university. During this time, he was already a member of the South Korean Socialist Workers' Alliance, along with Rhyu Si-min and Eun Su-mi. Cho was detained due to his activities, under breach of the National Security Act, and declared a prisoner of conscience by Amnesty International. Later, he criticised the National Security Act as a "barbaric law" in his book titled For the Freedom of Conscience and Ideology.

Since the 2000s, Cho has been involved in various activities related to human rights and democracy. He was a member of the People's Solidarity for Participatory Democracy, Committee of Determination of Punishment in Supreme Court, National Human Rights Commission, and the other various organisations.

Cho has never held any elected position, even though the former Democratic Party and its successor Democratic Unionist Party suggested that he run for a position as member of the National Assembly in Bundang 2nd constituency. There were also expectations that Cho would run for Superintendent of Education in Seoul during the local elections in 2014, but he declined. He did not even run for mayorship of Busan in 2018, despite public expectations.

Senior Secretary to the President for Civil Affairs, 2017–2019 

On 11 May 2017, the day after Moon Jae-in officially assumed the office of president, Cho was appointed Senior Secretary to the President for Civil Affairs. He was one of several non-prosecutors appointed to the position. He promised a clear investigation of the 2016 South Korean political scandal. This was welcomed by the People's Party, but also attacked by the Liberty Korea Party.

On 31 December 2018, Cho attended the House Steering Committee of the National Assembly. This "surprise" attendance was an issue in South Korean society, as such was not really done by former senior secretaries. A source reported that this negatively affected the approval ratings of President Moon.

Cho was replaced by Kim Joe-won on 26 July 2019.

Minister of Justice 
On 9 August 2019, Cho was nominated for the position of Minister of Justice replacing Park Sang-ki, by President Moon. He quoted General Lee Soon-shin and promised political reform. On 9 September, Cho was officially appointed Minister of Justice. Cho subsequently resigned 35 days after taking office due to a prosecution probe into various allegations surrounding his family.

Political orientation 
Cho is often regarded as liberal, even though he was labelled a "leftist" by several right-wing groups. Regarding the abolition of the death penalty, he said, "I understood the national sentiment, but it should be replaced with life imprisonment." He also mentioned that people should not argue with the criminality of abortion.

For issues related to the Korean Confederation of Trade Unions (KCTU), Cho announced that the government is not only for KCTU and impossible to satisfy their demands.

Controversies 
In his political career, Cho Kuk was embroiled in a number of scandals, including plagiarism and tax delinquencies. More significant scandals came from his pending nomination as the Minister of Justice, mainly concerning Cho Kuk's illicit business activities and falsification of academic achievements of his daughter, Cho Min.   There are numerous other allegations of corruption under public scrutiny.

Plagiarism 
Cho was frequently accused of plagiarism. In July 2013, Song Pyung-in of The Dong-a Ilbo and a conservative commentator Byun Hui-jae had mentioned that Cho plagiarized several theses written by Japanese scholars during his studies at Seoul National University in 1989. He replied that he underwent some problems with citations, although "unsure because it was long time ago", but then he apologized for it. On 26 June 2015, Seoul National University answered for the issue: some issues were found, which are not too serious.

A few months after the incident, both commentators claimed again that Cho's plagiarism continued at Berkeley in 1997. In response, Professor John Yoo said that no rechecking is required. Berkeley also mentioned that there was no proof for the accusations.

Tax delinquencies 
Cho faced another criticisms regarding tax delinquencies related to the Ungdong Institute. It was reported that he and his family did not pay legal costs for 3 years. He accepted that this was true, and made all necessary payments.

Illicit business activities
In 2017, it was revealed that Cho Kuk and his family invested a total of approximately 1.4 billion KRW, with a contract to invest an additional approximately seven billion KRW, into a private equity fund, CO-LINK. CO-LINK invested in a Korean company that is contracted in a multi-billion dollar computer network project in South Korea. On 27 August 2019, a search warrant was carried out by the prosecutor's office on suspect sites. On 29 August, the former wife of Cho's younger brother Cho Kwon, Cho Eun-hyang, who is listed as the owner or CEO of many of Cho Kuk's family businesses and properties, was denied boarding on an international flight out of Gimhae International Airport. Despite two full days of news reports, she claimed she was not aware of the flight ban placed on her. Furthermore, three other business associates of Cho Kuk's family, including a Cho Kuk relative, had already left the country before the ban was officially placed on them.

Kim Gyung-yul and his team of accountants and economic analysts of People's Solidarity for Participatory Democracy came to a conclusion that this is a crime involving political power.

On 31 October, Cho Kuk's younger brother, Cho Kwon, was arrested on charges of embezzlement and bribery.

Falsification of academic achievements of Cho Min

Cho Min, and her parents Cho Kuk and Chung Kyung-sim, have been accused of falsifying her academic achievements to get enrolled in prestigious universities and the medical school. Falsified academic achievements include her research in genetics and pathology, one of which has been retracted for violating ethical guidelines. A senior association of medical experts in South Korea condemned the paper as one of the most serious cases of academic misconduct in South Korean history and compared it to the Hwang Woo-suk scandal.

Indictment and arrest of Chung Kyung-sim
On 10 September 2019, shortly after Cho Kuk's nomination hearing, Cho Kuk's wife, Chung Kyung-sim, was officially indicted for forgery of a document by the prosecutor's office.  Prior to the charges and during the hearing, when asked what should happen if his wife should face charges, Cho Kuk replied that his wife should be held accountable to the fullest extent of the law.  Cho Kuk did not add that he would withdraw or resign from the nomination (Korea Times, 11 Sept. 2019, Chosunilbo, 10 Sept. 2019)

On 24 October Chung Kyung-sim was arrested for embezzlement using forged official documents and other charges.

On 23 December 2020, Chung Kyung-sim was found guilty and sentenced to four years in prison and fined 500 million won.

On 27 January 2022, the Supreme Court confirmed a four-year prison sentence for Chung Kyung-sim.

Books 
 Sex-biased Criminal Codes (1 March 2001)
 For the Freedom of Conscience and Ideology (30 August 2001)
 Prostitution (1 February 2004)
 Hearsay Rule of Illegally Acquired Evidences (20 March 2005)
 Plea-bargaining – Introduction Planning and Studies (2006)
 Introspecting Liberals (24 March 2008)
 Hymn of Bonobo (How to survive as human in jungle-capitalist Korea?) (11 May 2009)
 We're Telling You, South Korea – Our Homelands (3 January 2011)
 Why am I studying law? (15 June 2014)
 Criminal Law for Self-control (25 December 2014)

References 

1965 births
Living people
South Korean criminals
Justice ministers of South Korea
South Korean politicians convicted of crimes
People from Busan
Seoul National University School of Law alumni
UC Berkeley School of Law alumni
Academic staff of the University of Ulsan
Academic staff of Dongguk University
Academic staff of Seoul National University
South Korean legal scholars
Scholars of criminal law